Brian Sidney Bassano (born in East London, Cape Province, Union of South Africa, on 21 March 1936, died in Launceston, Tasmania, on 10 July 2001) was a South African journalist and cricket historian.

Life and career

After some years in England, Brian Bassano returned to South Africa in the late 1960s and became a journalist and cricket commentator on radio. With Donald Woods, he formed one of the first multiracial club teams in South Africa, the Rainbow Cricket Club in East London.

Bassano became a prolific historian of South Africa's international cricket up to 1970, and made a 30-part television history of South Africa's Test history from 1888 to 1970. He moved to Australia in 1988. Several of his histories were published posthumously.

His son Chris played first-class cricket for Derbyshire and Tasmania.

Books

 South Africa in International Cricket 1888–1970 1979
 The Best of South African Sport: Rob Armitage Benefit Year 1987 (editor)
 The West Indies in Australia 1930-31 (with Rick Smith) 1990
 A Springbok Down Under: South Africa on Tour, 1931-32 (with Rick Smith) 1991 (based on the diary of Ken Viljoen)
 Vic's Boys: Australia in South Africa 1935-36 1993
 South African Cricket: Vol. 4, 1947–1960 1996
 South Africa versus England: 106 Years of Test Match Glory 1996
 MCC in South Africa 1938-39 1997
 Aubrey Faulkner: His Record Innings by Innings 2001
 Mann's Men: MCC in South Africa 1922-23 2004
 The Visit of Mr W. W. Read's 1891-92 English Cricket Team to South Africa (with Rick Smith) 2007
 Maiden Victory: The 1935 South African Tour of England (with Rick Smith) 2012
 South African Test Cricketers 1888-89 – 1969-70 (edited by Rick Smith) 2022

References

1936 births
2001 deaths
Cricket historians and writers
South African emigrants to Australia
South African journalists
South African cricket commentators
Australian people of South African descent
People from East London, Eastern Cape
20th-century journalists